For the card game of poker for 2012, below are the results of the fifth season of the Latin American Poker Tour (LAPT). All currency amounts are in US dollars.

Results

LAPT Viña del Mar 
 LAPT CHILE NATIONAL POKER CHAMPIONSHIP
 Cassino: Enjoy Viña del Mar Casino & Resort
 Buy-in: $1,100
 4 Day-event: March 21–25, 2012
 Number of buy-ins: 672
 Total Prize Pool: U$D 651.840,00
 Number of Payouts: 104
 Winning Hand: J♣ 7♣

 Agreement among the finalists.

LAPT Punta del Este 
 Cassino: Mantra Resort SPA Casino
 Buy-in: $2,500
 5 Day-event: May 23–27, 2012
 Number of buy-ins: 375
 Total Prize Pool: U$D 836.625
 Number of payouts: 56
 Winning Hand: A♣

LAPT Colombia 
 LAPT COLOMBIA NATIONAL POKER CHAMPIONSHIP
 Cassino: Casino Allegre - Centro Comercial Premium Plaza
 Buy-in: Col$ 4,200,000 (approx. $2,300.00)
 5-day event: August 7–12, 2012
 Number of buy-ins: 337
 Total Prize Pool: COL 1,248,720.00 (U$D 698.377)
 Number of payouts: 48
 Winning Hand: Q♣

LAPT Panama 
 Cassino: Veneto Casino
 Buy-in: $2,500
 Data: September 26–30, 2012
 Number of buy-ins:  338
 Total Prize Pool: U$D 754.080
 Number of Payouts: 48
 Winning Hand: T♣

LAPT Lima 
 Cassino: Atlantic City Casino
 Buy-in: $2,500
 DAta: November 14–18, 2012
 Number of buy-ins: 376
 Total Prize Pool: US$ 838.860
 Number of Payouts: 56
 Winning Hand:  9♣

References  

 Results of LAPT

Latin American Poker Tour
2012 in poker